Demker station is a railway station in the municipality of Demker, located in the Stendal district in Saxony-Anhalt, Germany.

References

Railway stations in Saxony-Anhalt
Buildings and structures in Stendal (district)